A Blue Ribbon fishery is a designation made in the United States by government and other authorities to identify recreational fisheries of extremely high quality.  Official Blue Ribbon status is generally based on a set of established criteria which typically addresses the following elements:

 Water quality and quantity: A body of water, warm or cold, flowing or flat, will be considered for Blue Ribbon status if it has sufficient water quality and quantity to sustain a viable fishery.
 Water accessibility: The water must be accessible to the public.
 Natural reproduction capacity: The body of water should possess a natural capacity to produce and maintain a sustainable recreational fishery. There must be management strategies that will consistently produce fish of significant size and/or numbers to provide a quality angling experience.
 Angling pressure: The water must be able to withstand angling pressure.
 Specific species: Selection may be based on a specific species.

Criteria as used by Utah Division of Wildlife Resources. Specific criteria may vary by state.

Many quality recreational fisheries are informally referred to as Blue Ribbon by government agencies, tourist, media, environmental, sportsman organizations and writers, but are not officially designated as such by established criteria.

States with official Blue Ribbon fishery designations

 Michigan
 Missouri
 Montana, Montana recently converted their blue/red ribbon designations to a class system.
 Pennsylvania has a Class A Wild Trout Waters system.
 Utah
 Wisconsin – classified as Class I trout streams
Wyoming – classifies according to the number of pounds of trout per mile

Books

References

Recreational fishing in the United States
Rivers of the United States